Lake Linganore is a community in Frederick County, in the U.S. state of Maryland, located just outside New Market.

The community consists of "villages" which are essentially neighborhoods. The community of villages is centered on a system of lakes, the centerpiece of which is Lake Linganore, a  reservoir built on Linganore Creek, and the largest privately owned lake in the state. The community has its own newspaper, Lake Talk, which includes articles on local topics.

Population statistics for the area are tracked by the U.S. Census Bureau within the Linganore census-designated place.

History
Originally planned in 1968 as a "new town" by then developer Linganore Corporation (J. William Brosius and Louie J. Brosius), Eaglehead was the county's first planned unit development (PUD).

Villages

The villages which lie in Lake Linganore are:

Aspen
Aspen North
Audubon Condos
Audubon North
Audubon Terrace North
Balmoral
Coldstream
Lake Anita Louise
The Meadows
Nightingale
North Shore
Oakdale
Pinehurst
Summerfield
West Winds
Woodridge

External links
Lake Linganore Association, Inc.

Populated places in Frederick County, Maryland